Sirajdikhan is an upazila of Munshiganj District in the Division of Dhaka, Bangladesh. Villages in Sirajdikhan include Gopal Pur. Its total area is 180.19 km2. A large quantity of vegetables for the capital Dhaka is supplied by this upazila.

Demographics

As of the 1991 Bangladesh census, Sirajdikhan has a population of 229,085. Males constituted 51.02% of the population, and females 48.98%. The population aged 18 or over was 108,535. Sirajdikhan has an average literacy rate of 33.9% (7+ years), compared to the national average of 32.4%.

Administration
Sirajdikhan Upazila is divided into 14 union parishads: Bairagadi, Baluchar, Basail, Chitracoat, Ichhapura, Joyinshar, Keyain, Kola, Latabdi, Madhypara, Malkhanagar, Rajanagar, Rasunia, and Sekhornagar. The union parishads are subdivided into 124 mauzas and 178 villages.

See also
 Upazilas of Bangladesh
 Districts of Bangladesh
 Divisions of Bangladesh

References

Upazilas of Munshiganj District